Lair is an unincorporated community in Harrison County, Kentucky, United States.

History
The community was named after Isaac Newton Lair, an early settler. A post office was established as Lair's Station in 1860, was renamed Lair in 1882, and remained in operation until it was discontinued in 1920. In the 1870s, the community contained a store, two gristmills, and two distilleries.

References

Unincorporated communities in Harrison County, Kentucky
Unincorporated communities in Kentucky